Euparyphasma is a genus of moths belonging to the subfamily Thyatirinae of the Drepanidae. It was described by David Stephen Fletcher in 1979.

Species
 Euparyphasma albibasis Hampson, 1893
 Euparyphasma obscura Sick, 1941
 Euparyphasma maxima Leech, 1888

Former species
 Euparyphasma cinereofusca Houlbert, 1921

References

Thyatirinae
Drepanidae genera